Kerri Camar Chandler (born September 28 1969) is an American house DJ and record producer.

Biography
Chandler's influences go back to New Jersey, growing up in a family of jazz musicians. His father, Joseph Chandler, was a DJ and provided him with a background in the origins of soul, disco, and the New York Underground Sound. Accompanying his father to gigs, he began playing records at the Rally Racquet Club in East Orange, New Jersey at the age of 13.

At 14, he began interning in studios and producing music. Since the release of his first single "SuperLover/Get It Off" on Atlantic Records in 1991, Chandler has released over 100 records. He was a resident DJ at Club Zanzibar in Newark, New Jersey in the 1980s as well, home to the New Jersey sound brand of deep house or garage house.

He is the founder of the house music label Madhouse Records (not to be confused with Dave Kelly's reggae label of the same name) whose signings include Roy Ayers and Dennis Ferrer and more recently MadTech Records, whose roster includes No Artificial Colours, Citizen, Kashii, Waze & Odyssey, and Waifs & Strays.

In 2016 he founded his third record label, Kaoz Theory, which has included releases from notable artists Jamie Jones, Satoshi Tomiie, Seth Troxler, and The Martinez Brothers.

Discography

Studio albums
 Hemisphere (1996)
 First Steps (1999)
 Trionisphere (2003)
 Computer Games (2008)
 RA.EX269 Kerri Chandler (2015)
 Spaces and Places (2022)

Singles
 Super Lover (1990)
 Panic E.P.  (1992)
 Mistery Love (1993)
 Atmosphere E.P. Vol. 1 	(1993)

References

External links
 

Musicians from East Orange, New Jersey
American garage house musicians
American house musicians
Atlantic Records artists
Living people
American DJs
Club DJs
Deep house musicians
Future house musicians
1969 births
Electronic dance music DJs